Harry is an American sitcom television series created by Susan Kramer. The series stars Alan Arkin, Thom Bray, Matt Craven, Barbara Dana, Kurt Knudson, Richard Lewis and Holland Taylor. The series aired on ABC from March 4 to March 25, 1987.

Cast 
Alan Arkin as Harry Porschak
Thom Bray as Lawrence Pendelton
Matt Craven as Bobby Kratz
Barbara Dana as Dr. Sandy Clifton
Kurt Knudson as Wyatt Lockhart
Richard Lewis as Richard Breskin
Holland Taylor as Ina Duckett

Episodes

References

External links
 

1980s American sitcoms
1987 American television series debuts
1987 American television series endings
English-language television shows
American Broadcasting Company original programming
Television series by ABC Studios